France sent a delegation to compete at the 2010 Winter Paralympics in Vancouver, British Columbia, Canada. The country fielded seven athletes in cross-country skiing and biathlon, and fourteen in alpine skiing. The team’s flagbearer was alpine skier Romain Riboud.

On March 20, following France's third and fourth medals of the game, commentators on France Télévisions (the Games' broadcasters in France) noted that French Paralympians were not professionals (holding jobs, and training only during their spare time), and did not benefit from the same level of funding and support as athletes from certain more successful countries. They suggested that France might have to rethink the level of support it provided to its Winter Paralympians before the 2014 Winter Games in Sochi.

Alpine skiing 

France’s alpine skiing team consisted of three women (Marie Bochet, Solène Jambaqué and Nathalie Tyack) and eleven men (Vincent Gauthier-Manuel, Lionel Brun, Jean-Yves Le Meur, Nicolas Loussalez, Romain Ribout, Yohann Taberlet, Cyril Moré, Nicolas Béréjny, Cédric Amafroi-Broisat, Laurent Caul-Futy and Anthony Chalençon). France won all of its medals in this event. The medalists are:

  Nicolas Béréjny Men's Super-G, visually impaired
  Solène Jambaqué Women's Super Combined, standing 
  Solène Jambaqué Women's Downhill, standing 
  Vincent Gauthier-Manuel Men's Super Combined, standing 
  Vincent Gauthier-Manuel Men's Super-G, standing
  Vincent Gauthier-Manuel Men's Giant Slalom, standing

Biathlon 

France’s biathlon team consisted of one woman (Nathalie Morin) and five men (Yannick Bourseaux, Thomas Clarion, Georges Bettega, Romain Rosique and Thierry Raoux).

Cross-country skiing 

France’s cross-country skiing team consisted of seven athletes: the same six as in biathlon, plus Alain Marguerettaz.

See also
France at the 2010 Winter Olympics

References

External links
Vancouver 2010 Paralympic Games official website
International Paralympic Committee official website

Nations at the 2010 Winter Paralympics
2010
Paralympics